Grandview Apostolic Church was a historic church building in Brown County, Indiana, United States.  Built in 1892 along Grandview Ridge Road near the community of New Bellsville, it lay in far eastern Van Buren Township.  The church was a frame structure with a facade that featured a steeple, while the interior consisted of only a single room.

A part of the denomination known as the Apostolic Church, Grandview Apostolic was the second oldest existing church building in Brown County.  It closed during the twentieth century, but a congregation was restarted there in the early 1990s, and the building remained in active use by that congregation until 2010.  In 1991, the church building and two related structures, plus the cemetery, were added to the National Register of Historic Places because of their place in local history and because of their well-preserved historic architecture.  Such a distinction is unusual; both cemeteries and religious properties must pass higher hurdles than most other types of properties in order to qualify for inclusion on the National Register.

Before dawn on July 14, 2010, a neighbor called firefighters to report that the church was burning, prompting a response from firefighters from the Hamblen Township, Fruitdale, Nashville, and Van Buren Township volunteer fire departments.  Little more than half an hour after the initial emergency call, the fire was under control, but the church had already been destroyed; the only thing saved was the pastor's Bible.  Determined to continue as a congregation, the church's forty-five members later decided to take the name of "New Beginnings Church" and began worshipping elsewhere.

Within two weeks of the church's destruction, seven teenage residents of Columbus, Indiana were arrested and charged with arson.  One of the seven admitted setting the fire; according to him, the group committed the act as the result of a days-long planning process.  Claiming that the group burned the church while under the influence of LSD, he stated that they had believed Grandview Apostolic Church to be a community of Satan worshippers.

On September 29, 2010, the National Park Service withdrew the church's historic site status.

References

External links

Churches completed in 1892
Buildings and structures in Brown County, Indiana
Demolished churches in the United States
Former National Register of Historic Places in Indiana
National Register of Historic Places in Brown County, Indiana
Pentecostal churches in Indiana
Religious buildings and structures in the United States destroyed by arson
Vernacular architecture in the United States
Wooden churches in Indiana
Arson in Indiana
Former churches in Indiana
1892 establishments in Indiana
Buildings and structures demolished in 2010
2010 disestablishments in Indiana
Church fires in the United States